KBRX may refer to:

 KBRX-FM, a radio station (102.9 FM) licensed to O'Neill, Nebraska, United States
 KBRX (AM), a radio station (1350 AM) licensed to O'Neill, Nebraska, United States